Thomas Simpson (1755–1823) was a British civil engineer.

Career
Simpson was born in Blackwell, Carlisle and began his career in 1778 as a millwright until being appointed an inspector and engineer of the Chelsea Waterworks. He later also became an engineer at Lambeth Waterworks Company. He contributed to the introduction of iron fresh water pipes and replacement of wooden mains in London and throughout the United Kingdom, testifying before a Parliamentary select committee in 1821 that he had invented a method of making spigot and socket joints watertight by filling them with hemp or flax and then covering them in lead.  He also built a workshop to repair and maintain steam engines in 1785, which his son James Simpson took over and developed into James Simpson and Co. Ltd, later Worthington-Simpson Ltd, which after several further mergers currently trades as Flowserve.

References

External links
 — "The first bell and spigot joint was developed by Thomas Simpson of the Chelsea Water Company in England in 1785. The joint was caulked with juie rope impregnated with pine resin or tallow and sealed in place with molten lead. The bell and spigot joint remained the predominant pipe joint until the advent of the push-on joint, for example the TYTON® Joint, in 1956."

English civil engineers
1755 births
1823 deaths
People from Carlisle, Cumbria